"Baby I Lied" is a song recorded by American country music artist Deborah Allen.  It was released in August 1983 as the first single from the album Cheat the Night.  The song reached number 4 on the Billboard Hot Country Singles & Tracks chart. It was also her only hit on the Billboard Hot 100, where it went to number 26.  The song was written by Allen, Rafe Van Hoy and Rory Bourke. 

The B-side of the single, "Time is Taking You Away from Me" was written by Allen and Van Hoy, and is a track that has not appeared on any subsequent albums.

Critical reception
In The Encyclopedia of Country Music, Mary A. Bufwack wrote that the song showed "Allen's country-pop style, marked by a wall of sound and soulful singing".

Chart performance

Shannon Brown version

Shannon Brown released a cover of the song in 2001, taking it to number 40 on the country charts. Her version was to have been included on her BNA Records album Untangle My Heart, which was never released.

Critical reception
Deborah Evans Price of Billboard praised Brown's version of the song, saying that it "stands the test of time" and "Brown turns in a fine performance, shaded with ache and regret."

Chart performance

Other cover versions
Tracey Ullman recorded a cover of the song shortly after Allen released the song as a single.

References

1983 songs
1983 singles
2001 singles
Deborah Allen songs
Shannon Brown (singer) songs
Songs written by Rory Bourke
Songs written by Deborah Allen
RCA Records singles
BNA Records singles
Songs written by Rafe Van Hoy
Song recordings produced by Byron Gallimore